The 2024 European Parliament election is scheduled to be held in 2024 in line with the Treaty of Lisbon. As a result of Brexit, 27 seats from the British delegation were distributed to other countries in January 2020 (those elected but not yet seated took their seats). The other 46 seats were abolished with the total number of MEPs decreasing from 751 to 705 after that.

This will be the tenth parliamentary election since the first direct elections in 1979, and the first European Parliament election after Brexit.

Overview

Popular vote and seat projections

Seats 

The following table shows the projected number of seats for the groups in the EU Parliament.

Popular vote
The chart below depicts opinion polls conducted for the 2024 European Parliament election using a 6-poll moving average. From 31 January 2020, the United Kingdom is not included.

The following table shows the projected popular vote share for the groups in the EU Parliament aggregated on the European level. EU27 excludes the United Kingdom in this context. EU28 includes the United Kingdom.

Further reading
 Manuel Müller, Two years to go: What to expect from the 2024 European Parliament elections, Jacques Delors Centre, 30 May 2022.

Notes

References